Rhinoceros (typically abbreviated Rhino or Rhino3D) is a commercial 3D computer graphics and computer-aided design (CAD) application software that was developed by Robert McNeel & Associates, an American, privately held, and employee-owned company that was founded in 1969. Rhinoceros geometry is based on the NURBS mathematical model, which focuses on producing mathematically precise representation of curves and freeform surfaces in computer graphics (as opposed to polygon mesh-based applications).

Rhinoceros is used for computer-aided design (CAD), computer-aided manufacturing (CAM), rapid prototyping, 3D printing and reverse engineering in industries including architecture, industrial design (e.g. automotive design, watercraft design), product design (e.g. jewelry design) as well as for multimedia and graphic design.

Rhinoceros is developed for the Microsoft Windows operating system and macOS. A visual scripting language add-on for Rhino, Grasshopper, is developed by Robert McNeel & Associates.

Overview

Characteristics
Rhinoceros is primarily a freeform surface modeler that utilizes the NURBS mathematical model. Rhinoceros's application architecture and open SDK make it modular and enable the user to customize the interface and create custom commands and menus.

File formats 
The Rhinoceros file format (.3DM) is useful for the exchange of NURBS geometry. The Rhino developers started the openNURBS Initiative to provide computer graphics software developers the tools to accurately transfer 3-D geometry between applications. An open-source toolkit, openNURBS includes the 3DM file format specification, documentation, C++ source code libraries and .NET 2.0 assemblies to read and write the file format on supported platforms – Windows, Windows x64, Mac, and Linux.

Compatibility

Rhinoceros offers compatibility with other software as it supports over 30 CAD file formats for importing and exporting.

The following CAD and image file formats are natively supported (without the use of external plug-ins): 

 DWG/DXF (AutoCAD 200x, 14, 13, and 12)
 IGES
 STEP
 SolidWorks SLDPRT and SLDASM
 SAT (ACIS, export only)
 MicroStation DGN
 Direct X (X file format)

 FBX
 X_T (Parasolid, export only)
 .3ds
 LWO
 STL
 SLC
 OBJ

 AI
 RIB
 POV
 UDO
 VRML
 CSV (export properties and hydrostatics)
 BMP

 TGA
 uncompressed TIFF
 VDA
 GHS
 GTS
 KML
 PLY
 SketchUp

The following CAD file formats are supported with use of external plug-ins: 

 3DPDF
 ACIS
 CATIA V4
 CATIA V5

 CATIA V6
 CGR
 Inventor

 JT
 Parasolid
 PLMXML

 Creo Parametric
 Solid Edge
 Siemens NX

When opening CAD file formats not in its native .3dm file format, Rhinoceros will convert the geometry into its native format; when importing a CAD file, the geometry is added to the current file.

When Autodesk AutoCAD's file format changes (see DWG file format for more information), the Open Design Alliance reverse engineers the file format to allow these files to be loaded by other vendors' software. Rhinoceros's import and export modules are actually plug-ins, so they can be easily updated via a service release. Rhinoceros Service Releases (SR) are frequent and freely downloadable. Rhinoceros 5 SR10 can import and export DWG/DXF file formats up to version 2014.

Scripting and programming
Rhinoceros supports two scripting languages, Rhinoscript (based on VBScript) and Python (V5.0+ and Mac). It also has an SDK and a complete plug-in system.

See also
 Comparison of computer-aided design editors
 Computer-aided industrial design

References

External links
 

3D graphics software
Computer-aided design software
Computer-aided design software for Windows